Caroline L. Smith is an American linguist and Professor at the Department of Linguistics at the University of New Mexico. She is known for her works on phonology and is a founding member of the Association for Laboratory Phonology.

References

Phonologists
Living people
Year of birth missing (living people)
Linguists from the United States
Women linguists
University of New Mexico faculty
Yale University alumni
Bryn Mawr College alumni
Phoneticians